Matteo Candolini (born 9 October 1990) is an Italian footballer who plays for FC Morbio as a left back. Besides Italy, Candolini has played in England and Spain.

Club career
Born in Cantù, Candolini made his senior debuts with Biellese. In 2009, he moved to Savona, winning promotion to Lega Pro Seconda Divisione in 2010 and making his professional debuts in the 2010–11 campaign.

On 1 September 2011 Candolini joined Gavorrano, in the same category. After failing to appear for the side, he signed for Fenegrò Calcio in the following year.

In the 2014 summer Candolini moved abroad for the first time in his career, joining Dulwich Hamlet in Isthmian League Premier Division. After appearing in only two league matches he left the club, and switched clubs and countries in February 2015, after agreeing to a deal with Real Avilés in Spanish Segunda División B.

On 27 June 2019, Candolini returned to Associazione Stresa Sportiva for the second time. In December 2019, he then moved to Eccellenza club AC Ardor Lazzate.

References

External links
 

1990 births
Living people
People from Cantù
Italian footballers
Association football defenders
Serie C players
Serie D players
Eccellenza players
Isthmian League players
Segunda División B players
Savona F.B.C. players
U.S. Gavorrano players
Dulwich Hamlet F.C. players
Real Avilés CF footballers
Albissola 2010 players
U.S. Sestese Calcio players
Italian expatriate footballers
Italian expatriate sportspeople in England
Expatriate footballers in England
Italian expatriate sportspeople in Spain
Expatriate footballers in Spain
A.S.D. La Biellese players
Footballers from Lombardy
Sportspeople from the Province of Como